Võhma is a village in Saaremaa Parish, Saare County, Estonia. It is located on the northern coast of Saaremaa, the largest island in Estonia. The village had a population of 148 (as of 1 January 2000).

Before the administrative reform in 2017, the village was in Mustjala Parish.

Võhma is a site of an ancient Oeselian stronghold from the Viking Age.

References

Villages in Saare County